Yar Manamagan? is a 1961 Indian Tamil-language film produced and directed by P. Subramaniam. The film stars T. K. Balachandran and Kumari K. V. Janaki.

Plot

Cast 
The list is adapted from Thiraikalanjiyam Part2.

Male cast
T. K. Balachandran
V. K. Ramasamy
Kallapart Natarajan
D. Balasubrmaniam
C. S. Pandian
Female cast
Kumari K. V. Shanthi
Thilagam
C. R. Rajakumari
C. K. Saraswathi

Production 
The film was produced and directed by P. Subramaniam and was made in Malayalam titled Christmas Rathri.

Soundtrack 
Music was composed by Br Lakshmanan, while the lyrics were penned by Ku. Ma. Balasubramaniam and Sundarakannan. Playback singers are Thiruchi Loganathan, S. C. Krishnan, A. M. Rajah, P. B. Srinivas, P. Leela, K. Jamuna Rani, A. P. Komala and Renuka.

Reception 
The Indian Express wrote, "Except for the didactic nature of the proceedings, the technical values of the film are better than those of many others in its class".

References

External links 
 

1960s Tamil-language films
1961 drama films
1961 films
Indian drama films
Tamil remakes of Malayalam films
Films scored by Br Lakshmanan